The 1827 Vermont gubernatorial election took place in September and October, and resulted in the election of Ezra Butler to a one-year term as governor.

The Vermont General Assembly met in Montpelier on October 11. The Vermont House of Representatives appointed a committee to review the votes of the freemen of Vermont for governor, lieutenant governor, treasurer, and members of the governor's council. The committee determined that Ezra Butler had won election to a second one-year term. 

In the election for lieutenant governor, the committee determined that Democratic-Republican Henry Olin had won election to a one-year term. Newspapers of the time reported the vote totals as: Olin, 9,411 (67.5%); Samuel C. Crafts, 2,667 (19.1%); Israel P. Dana, 1,865 (13.4%).

Benjamin Swan won election to a one-year term as treasurer, his twenty-eighth. Though he had nominally been a Federalist, Swan was usually endorsed by the Democratic-Republicans and even after the demise of the Federalist Party he was frequently unopposed. According to a contemporary news account, Swan was chosen nearly unanimously, with no major opposition and only 17 votes scattering.

The vote totals in the governor's race were reported as follows:

Results

References

Vermont gubernatorial elections
gubernatorial
Vermont